Selz and its variant Seltz is a South German, Alsatian and Ashkenazic habitational surname for a person living in the originally Swabian and now French settlement Seltz (German spelling: Selz) and may refer to:

Selz 
Bernard Selz (born 1940), American financier
 Jane Weiller Selz (1912–1989), American golfer
Marc Selz (born c. 1970), American film director and producer
Otto Selz (1881–1943), German psychologist
Peter Selz (1919–2019), German-born American art historian and museum director

Seltz 
Rollie Seltz (born 1924), retired American basketball player

See also 
Selzer
Seltzer (surname)
Zeltser

References 

German-language surnames
Jewish surnames
Yiddish-language surnames